Really Doe may refer to:

 "Really Doe" (Danny Brown song), 2016
 "Really Doe" (Ice Cube song), 1993
 Really Doe (rapper), American rapper